Cleveland Elam (April 5, 1952 – July 12, 2012) was a National Football League defensive tackle who played for the San Francisco 49ers and the Detroit Lions in an injury-shortened five-year career that lasted from 1975 to 1979

Teaming with Cedric Hardman, Jimmy Webb and Tommy Hart, the 49ers Gold Rush defensive line led the NFL in sacks during the 1976 season.  Elam had 14.5 sacks in 1976 and led the team with 17.5 sacks in 1977.

Elam played college football at Tennessee State University and was drafted in the fourth round of the 1975 NFL Draft by the 49ers. He was a two time Pro Bowler in 1976 and 1977.

Elam died on July 12, 2012. He was survived by his wife Blanche and four children.

References

1952 births
2012 deaths
People from Memphis, Tennessee
American football defensive tackles
Tennessee State Tigers football players
San Francisco 49ers players
National Conference Pro Bowl players
Detroit Lions players